The Greene County School District is a public school district based in Leakesville, Mississippi (USA). The district's boundaries parallel that of Greene County.

Schools
Greene County High School
Leakesville Junior High School
Leakesville Elementary School
McLain Attendance Center - McLain
Sand Hill Elementary School

Demographics

2006-07 school year
There were a total of 2,013 students enrolled in the Greene County School District during the 2006–2007 school year. The gender makeup of the district was 51% female and 49% male. The racial makeup of the district was 18.28% African American, 81.57% White, and 0.15% Hispanic. 62.9% of the district's students were eligible to receive free lunch.

Previous school years

Accountability statistics

See also
List of school districts in Mississippi

References

External links

 

Education in Greene County, Mississippi
School districts in Mississippi